Badger Lake is a lake in Polk County, in the U.S. state of Minnesota.

Badger Lake was named for the badgers once common in the area.

See also
List of lakes in Minnesota

References

Lakes of Minnesota
Lakes of Polk County, Minnesota